Port Wentworth is a city in Chatham County, Georgia, United States. The 2020 population was 10,878, more than double the population of 5,359 at the 2010 census. Port Wentworth is part of the Savannah metropolitan area.

History
The Georgia General Assembly incorporated Port Wentworth in 1957.

Dixie Crystals plant explosion

On February 7, 2008, an explosion at the historic Dixie Crystals sugar plant, established in 1916 on Oxnard Drive, killed 14 people and injured at least 40 others. The victims ranged in age from 18 to 56. The blast could be heard as far away as Levy, South Carolina, where it shook house walls. The accident brought Port Wentworth national and international notice; it was widely reported in European and Asian media.

Geography
It is bordered by Effingham County to the north, by Garden City to the southeast, and by the Savannah city limits (surrounding Savannah/Hilton Head International Airport) to the southwest. Within the Port Wentworth city limits are the localities of Meinhard and Monteith.

Demographics

2020 census

As of the 2020 United States census, there were 10,878 people, 3,258 households, and 2,091 families residing in the city.

2010 census
As of the census of 2010,  5,359 people, 2,042 households, and 1,378 families were residing in the city. The racial makeup of the city was 61.1% White, 31.4% African American, 0.2% Native American, 1.7% Asian, 0.1% Pacific Islander, 2.8% some other race, and 2.6% from two or more races. Hispanics or Latinos of any race were 8.2% of the population.

Of the 2,042 households, 37.9% had children under  18 living with them, 48.8% were headed by married couples living together, 14.0% had a female householder with no husband present, and 32.5% were not families. About 24.2% of all households were made up of individuals, and 6.5% were someone living alone who was 65  or older. The average household size was 2.58, and the average family size was 3.08.

In the city, the age distribution was 25.9% under  18, 9.6% from 18 to 24, 33.5% from 25 to 44, 21.2% from 45 to 64, and 9.9% who were 65  or older. The median age was 31.8 years. For every 100 females, there were 94.4 males.

For the period 2008–2012, the estimated median annual income for a household in the city was $50,031, and for a family was $59,552. Male full-time workers had a median income of $47,786 versus $35,367 for females. The per capita income for the city was $25,295. About 11.7% of families and 15.8% of the population were below the poverty line, including 23.1% of those under age 18 and 18.6% of those age 65 or over.

Education
Port Wentworth is part of the Savannah-Chatham County Public School System.

Law enforcement
They city is served by the Port Wentworth Police Department.

Gallery

References

External links
 City of Port Wentworth website
 Port Wentworth Chamber of Commerce

Cities in Georgia (U.S. state)
Cities in Chatham County, Georgia
Populated coastal places in Georgia (U.S. state)
Savannah metropolitan area